The New York Nemesis were a women's tackle football team playing out of the Capital District of New York. It was a member of the Independent Women's Football League (IWFL), a league with over 30 teams across the United States. The Nemesis played in the Northern Conference, with home games on the campus of Schenectady High School in Schenectady.

The team was owned by ten year women's football veteran Carley Pesente, who is also a ranked professional boxer. She put together a strong management team led by GM Diane Wilkinson, and Alana Graziano Assistant GM and Team Delegate, both veteran's to the game of football.

After the 2010 IWFL season and since then, nothing has ever been heard of the Nemesis.

Season-By-Season

|-
| colspan="6" align="center" | New York Nemesis (NWFA)
|-
|2008 || 8 || 0 || 0 || 1st NC Northeast || First-round byeLost NC Semifinals (West Michigan)
|-
| colspan="6" align="center" | New York Nemesis (IWFL)
|-
|2009 || 5 || 3 || 0 || 2nd Tier I EC North Atlantic || --
|-
|2010 || 3 || 5 || 0 || 4th Tier I EC Northeast || --
|-
!Totals || 16 || 9 || 0
|colspan="2"| (including playoffs)

Season Schedules

2009

2010

References

External links
New York Nemesis website
IWFL website

American football teams in New York (state)
Independent Women's Football League
Schenectady, New York
Sports in Albany, New York
American football teams established in 2008
American football teams disestablished in 2011
2008 establishments in New York (state)
2011 disestablishments in New York (state)
Women's sports in New York (state)